The Oceania Netball World Cup Qualifiers was held on July 19-23, 2022. The event was hosted by Fiji and took place in Suva where the hosts welcomed Tonga, Samoa, Papua New Guinea, and the Cook Islands.

Competitions were held in a round robin format, with each match needed a winner. The winner awarded two points. At the end of the tournament, the top two teams were invited by 2023 Netball World Cup in Cape Town, South Africa.

Final standings

Matches

References

External links 
 netball.sport/archives

2022 in netball
2022 in Fijian sport
2022 in Oceanian women's sport
July 2022 sports events in Oceania
International netball competitions hosted by Fiji
Oceania